"What Do I Know" is a song by Ricochet from their self-titled debut album. It may also refer to:
"What Do I Know?", a song by Ed Sheeran from the album ÷
"What Do I Know", a song by Sara Groves from the album Conversations